Lom is a town in northwestern Bulgaria, part of Montana Province, situated on the right bank of the Danube, close to the estuary of the Lom River. It is the administrative centre of the eponymous Lom Municipality. It is the second most important Bulgarian port on the Danube after Ruse.

Geography 
The town of Lom is located near the mouth of the eponymous river Lom. Its development as a large river port center, second in importance to Bulgaria after Ruse, is determined by the fact that it is the closest port to the capital.

History

Antiquity and Middle Ages
Lom was founded by the Thracians under the name of Artanes in Antiquity. After the Romans called the fortress and the town Almus, from where the name of the today's city and of the Lom River comes.

There are no reports proving that there existed a big settlement in the Middle Ages. It was not until Ottoman rule that it enlarged but for a long time it was under the shadow of the dominant towns of Vidin, Nikopol and Silistra. It is assumed that the Ottoman village was founded in 1695 by Kara Mustafa and Murad Bey, who were defeated at Vienna in 1683 and who came here sailing rafts along the Danube.

Ottoman rule and Bulgarian National Revival
The name Lom Palanka was mentioned for the first time in 1704. The settlement then called Palanka stood between village and town in size and importance. In 1798 Lom suffered from brigand raids. With the development of shipping along the Danube after 1830, the importance of the town grew. The road to Sofia contributed to its progress and turned it into a main export port to Vienna (Austria). By 1869 there were 120 shops, 148 trade offices, 175 food shops, 34 coffee bars, six hotels and two mills. The town was centred on the old Kale (fortress), which was entered through three kapii (gates) — Vidinska, Belogradchishka, Sofiyska. The tradesmen from Lom offered goods at the biggest fairs in the region and beyond. In 1880 there were 7,500 inhabitants in the town.

Lom is proud of its traditions from the period of the Bulgarian National Revival. During the national revival, the first community centre in Bulgaria (1856) was founded in the town, the first women's society in the country was also established in 1858 and one of the first theatre performances took place in the town. Krastyu Pishurka, a noted educator, also worked in Lom.

Until the Second World War it was a major market town. In 1943, the Bulgarian government transported several thousand Jewish captives from Bulgarian-occupied territory in Greece and Yugoslavia to Lom to be embarked on boats bound for Vienna in Nazi Germany, from where they were taken to be exterminated in Treblinka. Lom was the main hub for the first deportations of victims of the Holocaust from the Axis-aligned Balkans. After 1944 the industry developed — sugar factory, can factory, grain industry. It became a port for the northwestern part of Bulgaria.

Neighbourhoods
Neighbourhoods of Lom include:
Boruna
Humata
Kaletata
Lyulyatsite
Mladenovo
Mladost
Momin brod
Stadiona
Zornitsa

Landmarks
Plazha - the 500 m. long pebbled beach at the bank of the Danube River, 3 km. from the centre of the city
Town Museum of History, housed in the building of the old town-hall.
Preserved foundations of the antique fortress Almus
Postoyanstvo, the oldest community centre in Bulgaria
Building of the former School of Pedagogy
The Church of Boruna
Monument of Tseko Voivoda (1807–1881), a participant in the battles for liberation of Serbia and proclaimed by the Serbian government to be a voyvoda (revolutionary leader)

Religion
The majority of the population of Lom is Christian Orthodox. The second biggest religious group is Protestantism-adventists and baptists.

Notable people

Born in Lom 

 Alexander Belev (? – 1944), politician
 Alexander Raichev, composer
 Alexander Chirkov (1938 – 2020), doctor, performed the first heart transplant in Bulgaria (1986)
 Andrej Andreev (1943 –), doctor
 Anton Tornjov (1868 – 1942), architect
 Asen Parteniev (1876 – 1905), revolutionary
 Bojcho Bojchev (1902 – 1971), doctor
 Bojan Smilov (1885 – 1947), politician
 Cvetan Minkov (1891 – 1967), writer
 Cvetan Todorov (1899 – 1962), linguist
 Cenko Tsvetanov (1904 – 1960), writer and bibliographer
 Chavdar Chakarov (1977 – 2005), writer
 Violeta Minkova (1932 – 1992), actress
 Vladimir Shkodrov (1930 – 2010), astronomer
 Georgi Ivanov, revolutionary
 Georgi Chaushov (1938 –), painter and animator
 Dimitar Marinov (1846 – 1940), public figure
 Ekaterina Blagoeva (1933 –) geographer and landscape scientist
 Emil Andreev (1956 –), writer
 Emil Minkov (1930 – 2003), musician
 Igor Damjanov (1953 –), politician
 Iskra Fidosova (1971 –), politician
 Jordan Gavrilov (1904 – 1997), professor
 Jana Jazova (1912 – 1974), writer
 Kiril Drangov (1901 – 1946), revolutionary
 Marion Koleva (1956 –), journalist
 Marian Ognjanov (1988 –), footballer
 Milko Bechev (1926 – 1988), architect
 Milcho Goranov (1928 – 2008), footballer, bronze medalist
 Mihail Kantardzhiev (1910 – 2002), chess player
 Mihail Lazarov, revolutionary
 Nikola Logofetov (1880 – 1945), politician and lawyer
 Nikola Parvanov (1837 – 1872), bookman
 Obreten Evstatiev (1891 – 1946), conductor
 Petar Berkovski (1852 – 1892), revolutionary
 Parvan Draganov (1890 – 1945), officer and politician
 Simeon Pironkov (1927 – 2000), compositor
 Todor Borov (1901 – 1933), bibliographer
 Todor Jonchov (1859 – 1940), teacher and public figure
 Todor Petrov (1919 – 1992), painter
 Todor Pironkov (1891 – 1962), artist
 Ralcho Trashliev (1930 – 2014), psychiatrist, pedagogy professor

Died in Lom 

 Krastjo Pishurka (1823 – 1875), national awakener
 Miron Iliev (? – 1914), icon painter

Others, connected with Lom 

 Louis-Emil Eyer (1865 – 1916), swiss, co-founder of the sport movement in Bulgaria, physical education teacher
 Jonas Basanavičius (1851 – 1927), Lithuanian popular figure
 Dimitar Spisarevski (1916 – 1943), flighter

Honour
Lom Peak on Livingston Island in the South Shetland Islands, Antarctica is named after Lom.

Municipality

The municipality of Lom consists of the following 9 villages plus the town of Lom itself, which is the administrative centre of the municipality.

Twin towns – sister cities
Lom is twinned with:
 Băilești, Romania
 Debar, North Macedonia
 Pantelej (Niš), Serbia
 Moudania, Greece

References

External links

The Official Site of Lom

Towns in Bulgaria
Populated places on the Danube
Populated places in Montana Province
Port cities and towns in Bulgaria